Rose Nyaboke Ogega (née Rose Nyaboke), is a Kenyan accountant, businesswoman and corporate executive, who serves as the chief executive officer of Bloom Consultancy Limited, a Nairobi-based organization that develops leadership skills through executive mentoring and coaching. She concurrently serves as a board member of several large public and private companies, including Safaricom, the largest mobile network operator in Kenya.

Background and education
She was born in Kenya circa 1965. She holds a Bachelor of Commerce degree, awarded by the University of Nairobi. She is a Fellow of the Institute of Certified Public Accountants of Kenya. She is also a Fellow of the Africa Leadership Initiative (East Africa) and a member of the Aspen Global Leadership Network.

Career
Ogega started out her career as an accountant, at PriceWaterhouse Kenya, in 1985. From there, she worked at DHL International, as the Finance Director for East Africa, based in Nairobi, Kenya's capital city.

In 2009, at the age of 34 years, she left DHL and started her own consulting firm, Bloom Consultancy Limited. While there, she serves as an accountant, corporate governance specialist, entrepreneur, management consultant, non executive director and public official.

In February 2019, Safaricom Plc., Kenya’s largest listed company, appointed Ogega to its board of directors, effective 12 February 2019. As an independent non-executive director, she is one of four women on the eleven-person board.

Other considerations
Ogega has in the past served as a member of the board at Barclays Bank of Kenya, UAP Old Mutual Holdings and as the chairperson of the advisory board of Women Enterprise Fund (WEF). WEF aims to empower poor women through wealth creation and enable them to have choices and live with dignity. She has also served as the chairperson of the Institute of Certified Public Accountants of Kenya (ICPAK).

See also
 Kathryne Maundu
 Esther Koimett
 Linda Watiri Muriuki

References

External links
 Website of Saricom Plc.
 About Bloom Consultancy Limited
 Executive Coach Rose Ogega Joins Safaricom Board As of 15 February 2019.

Living people
1965 births
Kenyan accountants
21st-century Kenyan businesswomen
21st-century Kenyan businesspeople
University of Nairobi alumni
Kenyan women business executives
Kenyan chief executives